Time Enna Boss!? is an Indian Tamil-language science fiction sitcom web series directed by Subu. The plot of the film who facing the regular adventures of an IT man, who finally ends up sharing his condo with four random time travelers from unique time periods, who by chance get trapped in modern-day Chennai.  It was released on Amazon Prime Video

Cast

Main 
 Bharath as Balamurugan (Bala)
 Karunakaran as Buggy
 Robo Shankar as Killi Vallavan (Killi)
 Priya Bhavani Shankar as Dr. Bharathi
 Sanjana Sarathy as Hannah Clarke
 Alexander Babu as Watchman Sandosham

Guest stars 
 Mamathi Chari as House Owner
 Pavithra Lakshmi as Sandhiya
 R.S. Shivaji as Roon Jaham
 George Maryan as Aalavaayan
 R. Aravindraj as Traffic Constable
 Ashok Selvan as Kabir Kannan
Maya S. Krishnan as Velleli
 Mippu as Customer
 Pallavi Sadanand as Suganthi
 Vignesh Vijayan as Britto
 Radha Mani as Balamurugan's grandmother
 Rajendran as "Semma Singer" Judge / Mahatma Gandhi from Earth 36
 R. Parthiban as Narrator
 Lollu Sabha Swetha as Bala's auntie

Release 
The series was released in Amazon Prime Video on September 18, 2020.

List of episodes

Season 1

References

External links 

Amazon Prime Video original programming
Tamil-language comedy television series
2020 Tamil-language television series debuts
Tamil-language fantasy television series
Tamil-language web series